Markus Fischer is a German author of multiple books, as well as a contributor to various volumes He is professor at the faculty of foreign languages and literatures at the University of Bucharest.

Professional experience 
 1986–1987 – Visiting lecturer at the University of Tübingen, German Department
 1987–1992 – Director of the Course for German Language and Culture at the University of Heidelberg
 1992–1997 – DAAD lecturer at the German Department of the University of Bucharest
 1997–2000 – Lecturer at the Institute for German as a Foreign Language Philology, University of Heidelberg
 2000–2005 – DAAD lecturer at the German Department of the University of Cairo
 2005–2008 – Lecturer at the Institute for German as a Foreign Language Philology, University of Heidelberg
 2008–today – Freelancer at the German daily newspaper ADZ ("Allgemeine Deutsche Zeitung für Rumänien")
 2011–2012 – Pedagogical director of the private German school "Deutsche Schule Bukarest”
 2014–2018 – Senior lecturer at the German Department of the University of Bucharest
 Since 2018 – University professor at the German Department of the University of Bucharest

Education 
 1963–1975: School (primary and gymnasium)
 1976–1978: Studies at the University of Tübingen
 1978–1979: Studies at the University of Cambridge
 1979–1982: Studies at the University of Tübingen
 1982–1986: PhD "magna cum laude" at the Faculty of Philology of the University of Tübingen
 2017: Habilitation (Dr. habil.) at the University of Bucharest

Bibliography

Books 
 Augenblicke um 1900. Literatur, Philosophie, Psychoanalyse und Lebenswelt zur Zeit der Jahrhundertwende, Frankfurt am Main, Bern, New York 1986 (Tübinger Studien zur deutschen Literatur, vol. .11).
 Celan-Lektüren. Reden, Gedichte und Übersetzungen Paul Celans im poetologischen und literarhistorischen Kontext, Berlin 2014 (Literaturwissenschaft, vol. 38).

Contributions 
 " 'Mein Tagebuch enthält fast nur absolut persönliches'. Zur Lektüre von Arthur Schnitzlers Tagebüchern", in: Text+Kritik, ed. by Heinz Ludwig Arnold, nos. 138/139: Arthur Schnitzler, April 1998, pp. 24–35.
 " 'Keime aus russischem Boden' – Zum Rußlandbild des Naturalismus", in: Russen und Rußland aus deutscher Sicht. 19./20. Jahrhundert: Von der Bismarckzeit bis zum Ersten Weltkrieg, ed. by Mechthild Keller, (West-östliche Spiegelungen, ed. by. Lew Kopelew, series A, vol. 4), Munich 2000, pp. 642–671.
 ""Latinität und walachisches Volkstum – Zur Gestalt Mandrykas in Hofmannsthals lyrischer Komödie Arabella", in: Hofmannsthal. Jahrbuch zur europäischen Moderne 8/2000, pp. 199–213.
 " 'Blieb nur der Städtehimmel, dieser kolossale Rachen' – Zur Großstadtthematik im Werk Durs Grünbeins", in: Historische Gedächtnisse sind Palimpseste.
 "Der Wanderer, seine Rede und ihr Schatten – Bemerkungen zu Texten von Büchner, Nietzsche, Kafka und Celan", in: Philosophie, Kunst und Wissenschaft. Memorial publication for Heinrich Kutzner, ed. by Richard Faber, Brigitte Niestroj and Peter Pörtner, Würzburg 2001, pp. .101–110.
 " 'Also sind wir Multikulti oder nicht?' – Zur Ethnologie der Identität in Richard Wagners Roman Das reiche Mädchen", in: Minderheitenliteraturen – Grenzerfahrung und Reterritorialisierung. Festschrift for Stefan Sienerth, ed. by George Gutu et al., Bukarest 2008, pp. 227–244.
 "Glauben und Wissen in Kafkas Prosastück Das Schweigen der Sirenen", in: Glauben und Wissen. Zum Verhältnis dieser Begriffe in der klassischen deutschen Philosophie, ed. by Daniel N. Razeev, Saint Petersburg 2008, pp. 289–292.
 "Zigeunerfiguren im Romanwerk von ", in: Zigeuner' und Nation. Repräsentation – Inklusion – Exklusion, ed. by Herbert Uerlings and Iulia-Karin Patrut, Frankfurt a. M. 2008, pp. 445–468.

Scientific articles 
 Deutschsprachige Literatur arabischer Migranten und die ägyptische Germanistik, in: West-östlicher Seiltanz. Deutsch-arabischer Kulturaustausch im Schnittpunkt Kairo, hg. von Alexander Haridi, Bonn 2005, PAG.103–106.
 „Es ist eine mythische Landschaft, die nur versteht, wer dort geboren wurde.“ – Hans Bergels Siebenbürgen-Epos Die Wiederkehr der Wölfe als europäischer Zeitroman, in: Spiegelungen. Zeitschrift für deutsche Kultur und Geschichte Südosteuropas, 2/2007, Heft 1, PAG.21–28.
 Ironie als Grabschmuck. Zur Gegenwartsbewältigung in Johann Lippets Erzählung Der Totengräber (1997), in: Interkulturelle Grenzgänge. Akten der wissenschaftlichen Tagung des Bukarester Instituts für Germanistik zum 100. Gründungstag, hg. von George Gutu und Doina Sandu, Bukarest 2007, PAG.153–164.
 Das Eigene im Fremden. Zur Dialektik des Ägyptenbildes in Ingeborg Bachmanns unvollendetem Roman Der Fall Franza, in: Transcarpathica. Germanistisches Jahrbuch Rumänien 3–4/2004–2005, hg. von Andrei Corbea-Hoisie und Alexander Rubel, Bukarest 2008, PAG. 112–132.
 Interkulturalität und west-östliche Thematik im Romanwerk von Catalin Dorian Florescu, in: Transcarpathica. Germanistisches Jahrbuch Rumänien 5–6/2006–2007, hg. von Roxana Nubert und Johannes Lutz, Bukarest 2009, PAG.24–35.
 „Die Völker fangen wieder an zu wandern“ – Dimensionen des Wandermotivs in der frühen Lyrik von Immanuel Weißglas, in: Immanuel Weißglas (1920–1979). Studien zum Leben und Werk, hg. von Andrei Corbea-Hoişie et al., Jassy, Konstanz 2010, PAG.245–258 (= Jassyer Beiträge zur Germanistik XIV).
 Literarische Bilder von Bukarest. Christian Hallers Trilogie des Erinnerns, in: Deutsches Jahrbuch für Rumänien 2011, Bukarest 2011, PAG. 151–154.
 Unerschöpflicher Erzählquell Siebenbürgen. Hans Bergels neuer Geschichtenband Die Wildgans, in: Deutsches Jahrbuch für Rumänien 2012, Bukarest 2012, PAG. 117–120.
 Jüdische Tradition in rumänischer Geschichte und Gegenwart. Das Jüdische Staatstheater Bukarest, in: Deutsches Jahrbuch für Rumänien 2013, Bukarest 2013, PAG. 181–185.

Reviews 

 "Helmut Braun, Ich bin nicht Ranek. Annäherung an Edgar Hilsenrath", in: Spiegelungen. Zeitschrift für deutsche Kultur und Geschichte Südosteuropas, 3/2007, no. 3, pp. 330–332.
 "Irena Brezna, Die beste aller Welten", in: Spiegelungen. Zeitschrift für deutsche Kultur und Geschichte Südosteuropas, 3/2009, no. 3, pp. 291urm.
 "Sándor Márai, Die Möwe", in: Spiegelungen. Zeitschrift für deutsche Kultur und Geschichte Südosteuropas, 4/2009, no. 4, pp .405urm.
 "E. M. Cioran, Über Deutschland. Aufsätze aus den Jahren 1931–1937", in: Spiegelungen. Zeitschrift für deutsche Kultur und Geschichte Südosteuropas, 7/2012, no. 2, pp. 184–186.
 "Cristina Spinei, Über die Zentralität des Peripheren. Auf den Spuren von Gregor von Rezzori", in: Spiegelungen. Zeitschrift für deutsche Kultur und Geschichte Südosteuropas, 7/2012, no. 4, pp. 424–426.

Translations 

 Nicolae Iorga, Czernowitz, in: Czernowitz. Jüdisches Städtebild, hg. von Andrei Corbea-Hoisie, Frankfurt am Main 1998, pag. 119–125.

References

German male writers
University of Tübingen alumni
Academic staff of the University of Bucharest